Recordings From Live Performance, 1981 - 1983 is a live album by American post-punk band Savage Republic, released in 1992 by Independent Project Records.

Track listing

Personnel
Adapted from the Recordings From Live Performance, 1981 - 1983 liner notes.

Savage Republic
 Philip Drucker (as Jackson Del Rey) – percussion (A1, A3, B1-B3, D4), vocals (B1, D1, D3, D4), guitar (C2, C3, D3), monotone guitar (A2)
 Mark Erskine – drums
 Bruce Licher – bass guitar (A2, A3, B2, B3, C2, D2-D4), vocals (A2, B1, C3, D3), monotone guitar (A1, D1), percussion (B1, C1), backing vocals (B3), design
 Jeff Long – bass guitar (A1, B3, C1, C3, D1, D3), vocals (B3, C1, D3), monotone guitar (A3, B2)
 Robert Loveless – keyboards (A1, C2, D1)

Additional musicians
 Kendra Smith – percussion (A2, B1, D4), bass guitar (D4)
Production and additional personnel
 Edward Batt – photography
 Eddy Schreyer – mastering

Release history

References

External links 
 

1992 live albums
Savage Republic albums